The Guffert is a  high, isolated, prominent limestone alpenstock in the Brandenberg Alps (Rofan) that, together with the Guffertstein, forms a twin peak. It lies north of Steinberg am Rofan. Because it projects above the Mangfall Mountains to the north by about 300 metres, the striking double peak is easily recognised from the Alpine Foreland, the Tegernsee and the Bavarian Prealps.

References

External links 

 Tour description 
 Tour description at bergschrei.de 

Mountains of the Alps
Mountains of Tyrol (state)
Two-thousanders of Austria
Brandenberg Alps